openSIS is one of several free and open source student information system available to K-12 and higher education institutions.  The solution has been in development for several years and appears to have much of the functionality that long time commercial versions have.  The solution is a web-based application developed and maintained by Open Solutions for Education, Inc. (www.os4ed.com).

openSIS is written in PHP  and uses MySQL to store information. The community edition is released under the terms of the GNU General Public License, is free software, and can be downloaded from the SourceForge and opensis.com websites.  The application is stable, and is in active development cycle with continuing activity in the community forums.  openSIS is also offered as a cloud hosted SaaS version at a low cost. Professional and Surge versions are not free but are affordable.

Product features
According to the company's website, the solutions features these base features:

Student ID Photograph
Demographic Information
Contact Information
Parent's and Guardian's Information
Gradebook
Multiple Canned Reports
Report Cards
Transcripts
Health Records
Multiple types of Scheduling
Built-in Messaging
Attendance
Parent Portal
User Customizable Preferences
Security
Light Weight IEP
Staff Information
Staff Certification

These are listed as additional modules available in their paid edition or cloud version that is hosted:

Discipline
Email Messaging
Student Billing
Library Management
On-line Applicant Processing/Admissions
US State Reporting (important for US based schools and districts)
Available Integrations with Learning Management System (LMS) and CRM:
Moodle Integration
Google Classroom Integration
SuiteCRM Integration
HubSpot Integration
Available Single Sign On (SSO) Integrations:

 Office365
 Google Workspace
 Any OAuth based application

See also
 OpenEMIS, alternative open source
 SchoolTool, alternative open source

Notes

External links 
 community development and anonymous download
 Official openSIS site

Learning management systems
Free software projects
Free educational software
School-administration software